Battus polydamas antiquus is an extinct subspecies of the Polydamas swallowtail within the butterfly family Papilionidae. It is only known by a drawing from 1770 by British entomologist Dru Drury. It was endemic to Antigua.

There are 21 Battus polydamas subspecies. B. p. antiquus is the only subspecies currently listed as extinct. Dru Drury received his butterflies from a variety sources during a period of history when cartography was not precise. There exists, to those who have examined his three-volume work Illustrations of Natural History, a plethora of errors in his taxonomy. Such errors may indicate that B. p. antiquus never existed at all. It may be the only butterfly said to have gone extinct on account of having never existed. It is a hypothetical extinct species.

Description
Drury's illustration depicts a male. The ground color of the forewings and hindwings is black. The upperside of the forewings consists of a row of eight green spots. The upper four spots are small. The sixth one is the biggest. The row of spots on the hindwing is narrower.

References
 Walter Rothschild & Karl Jordan (1906): A Revision of the American Papilios. In: Novitates Zoologicae Volume 13: p 523
 F. Martin Brown and Bernard Heineman, Jamaica and its Butterflies (E. W. Classey, London 1972)
 Smart, Paul (1976). The Illustrated Encyclopedia of the Butterfly World in Color. London, Salamander: Encyclopedie des papillons. Lausanne, Elsevier Sequoia (French language edition)   page 159 fig. 19 as B. archidamas Bsdv., underside (Chile), fig. 17 as polydamas (Mexico)

polydamas antiquus
Extinct butterflies
Butterflies described in 1906
Butterfly subspecies
Hypothetical extinct species